Zephath may refer to:

Safed, a city in Galilee
Hormah, an unidentified place mentioned in the Bible